Dinosaurs Alive! is a 2007 IMAX documentary produced by Giant Screen Films about various dinosaurs that inhabited the Earth between 251 and 65 Ma. The documentary features animals from the Triassic period of New Mexico to the Cretaceous period of Mongolia, as well as the American Museum of Natural History's research on both periods.

Featured Animals 

 Protoceratops 
 Velociraptor 
 Unidentified pterosaurs (most likely Kepodactylus)
 Seismosaurus 
 Tarbosaurus 
 Tarchia 
 Pinacosaurus (mentioned) 
 Oviraptor 
 Confuciusornis 
 Sinosauropteryx (shown)
 Microraptor (shown)
 Sinornithosaurus (shown) 
 Effigia 
 Coelophysis
 Postosuchus
 Redondasaurus

See also
 Dinosaurs of Antarctica
Dinosaurs: Giants of Patagonia
 Dinosaur Planet
 T-Rex: Back to the Cretaceous
 Walking with Dinosaurs
 When Dinosaurs Roamed America
 Dinosaurs Alive (attraction), a former kid's area at various Cedar Fair theme parks.

External links
Official website
Big Movie Zone
Film Journal Review

Documentary films about dinosaurs
IMAX short films
2007 3D films
3D short films
IMAX documentary films
3D documentary films
2000s English-language films